Bulgaria–Italy relations are foreign relations between Bulgaria and Italy. Both countries established diplomatic relations in 1879. Bulgaria has an embassy in Rome, a general consulate in Milan and six honorary consulates (in Ancona, Florence, Genoa, Naples, Turin and Treviso). Italy has an embassy in Sofia and an honorary consulate in Plovdiv. Both countries are full members of the European Union, NATO, OSCE, Council of Europe and the World Trade Organization.
Italy has given full support to Bulgaria's membership in the European Union and NATO.

History

The territories of the modern nations of Bulgaria and Italy formed part of the ancient Roman Empire.

Troops from Bulgaria and the Italian states of Venice, Genoa and Savoy fought together as part of a larger European coalition at the Battle of Nicopolis in 1396 in an attempt to stop the Ottoman invasion of Bulgaria. In 1444, Bulgarian insurgents of Fruzhin and troops from the Italian Papal States fought together at the Battle of Varna, also as part of a larger European coalition, in an attempt to repel the Ottoman invasion of Europe and liberate the already conquered nations of Southeast Europe, including Bulgaria.

Both countries were members of the Axis powers during World War II, allies of Nazi Germany and the Japanese Empire, however both eventually switched allegiance to the Allies.

Current relations
Bulgaria and Italy co-hosted the 2015 Men's European Volleyball Championship and 2018 FIVB Volleyball Men's World Championship.

Italy is one of Bulgaria's main trading partners. In 2019, Italy was the third largest source of imports and export destination for Bulgaria.

Diplomacy

Republic of Bulgaria
Rome (Embassy) 
Milan (Consulate-General)

Republic of Italy
Sofia (Embassy)

See also 
 Foreign relations of Bulgaria
 Foreign relations of Italy
 Bulgarians in Italy

References

External links
  Bulgarian embassy in Rome
Bulgarian general consulate in Milan
Italian embassy in Sofia

 
Italy
Bilateral relations of Italy